Cáseres is a surname. Notable people with the surname include:

Facundo Cáseres (born 2001), Argentine footballer
Ramiro Cáseres (born 1994), Argentine footballer
Santiago Cáseres (born 1997), Argentine footballer